Pluteus cervinus, also known as Pluteus atricapillus and commonly known as the deer shield or the deer or fawn mushroom, is a mushroom that belongs to the large genus Pluteus. It is found on rotten logs, roots and tree stumps and is widely distributed.  It can also grow on sawdust and other wood waste.  Being very variable in appearance, it has been divided into several varieties or subspecies, some of which are sometimes considered species in their own right.  It is edible when young, but considered by some to be of poor quality and is not often collected for the table.

Taxonomy
The species name, cervinus, although generally thought to refer to the colour of the cap, actually refers to antler-like protrusions on its prominent thick-walled pleurocystidia (of which there can be one to three).

Description
Initially it is bell-shaped, and often wrinkled when young. Later it expands to a convex shape. The cap can be deer-brown, but vary from light ochre-brown to dark brown, with a variable admixture of grey or black. The centre of the cap may be darker. The cap surface is smooth and matte to silky-reflective. The cap skin shows dark radial fibres when seen through a lens, indicating that the microscopic cuticle structure is filamentous. The gills are initially white, but soon show a distinctive pinkish sheen, caused by the ripening spores. The stipe is 5–12 cm long and 0.5–2 cm in diameter, usually thicker at the base. It is white and covered with brown vertical fibrils. The flesh is soft and white. The mushroom has a mild to earthy radish smell and a mild taste at first, which may become slightly bitter.

The spore size is approximately 8×5μ, and the individual spores are elliptical and smooth. The spore print is salmon-pink to reddish brown.

It grows on logs and stumps, and can be found most commonly in the spring and fall.

Similar species
The species looks similar to some dangerous Entoloma species, which also have pink spore prints but grow on the ground. Other similar species include P. atromarginatus, P. romellii, and P. petasatus.

Gallery

See also
List of Pluteus species

Citations

References
This article is partly translated from the German page.
Meinhard Moser: Basidiomycetes II: Röhrlinge und Blätterpilze, Gustav Fischer Verlag Stuttgart (1978).  English edition:  translated by Simon Plant: Keys to Agarics and Boleti (Roger Phillips 1983)
Régis Courtecuisse, Bernard Duhem : Guide des champignons de France et d'Europe (Delachaux & Niestlé, 1994-2000).  

Edible fungi
cervinus
Fungi of Europe
Fungi of North America
Fungi described in 1871
Taxa named by Jacob Christian Schäffer